The 1st Dental Battalion is a Fleet Marine Force unit of the United States Navy.  The battalion includes fifteen dental clinics spread throughout California and Arizona.  The unit is based out of Marine Corps Base Camp Pendleton and falls under the command of the 1st Marine Logistics Group and the I Marine Expeditionary Force.

Mission
To provide oral healthcare for war fighters and maintain operational readiness.

History

The 1st Dental Battalion runs 10 dental clinics on MCB Camp Pendleton and also runs clinics at Marine Corps Air Station Yuma, Marine Corps Air Station Miramar, Marine Corps Logistics Base Barstow, Marine Corps Air Ground Combat Center Twentynine Palms, and Mountain Warfare Training Center in Bridgeport, California.

Personnel
Navy Dental Corps

See also

 History of the United States Marine Corps
 List of United States Marine Corps battalions
 Fleet Marine Force insignia

External links
 Website of the 1st Dental Battalion's 

Medical battalions of the United States Marine Corps
Naval dentistry